Pansy is an unincorporated community in Cleveland County, Arkansas, United States.

References

Unincorporated communities in Cleveland County, Arkansas
Unincorporated communities in Arkansas